Kei Nishikori was the defending champion but decided not to participate.
Jesse Levine won the title, defeating Brian Baker 6–2, 6–3 in the final.

Seeds

Draw

Finals

Top half

Bottom half

References
 Main Draw
 Qualifying Draw

Knoxville Challenger - Singles
2011 Singles